Bohannan is a surname. People with the name include:

 Ambrose Bohannan, Virginia settler
 Barbara Bohannan-Sheppard (born 1950), American politician
 Brendan Bohannan, microbial and evolutionary biologist
 Christina Bohannan (born 1971), American engineer, legal scholar, and politician
 R. LeFond Bohannan, founder of the Medical College of Virginia
 John G. Bohannan (b. 1827–1897), Confederate Army colonel, State Representative from Matthews County, Virginia (1885–1886), father of Charles G.
 Charles G. Bohannan (b. 1852), mayor of South Norwalk, Connecticut (1897–1898, 1899–1901) son of John G.
 Laura Bohannan (1922–2002), American cultural anthropologist and author; wife of Paul
 Paul Bohannan (1920–2007), American anthropologist; husband of Laura
 Thomas Bohannan (b. 1955), American Thoroughbred racehorse trainer